Muhammad Umar Bahah is a Yemeni writer and journalist. Originally from South Yemen, he wrote for several newspapers and was press secretary of Ali Nasir Muhammad, two-time president of South Yemen. Bahah's work has been translated into English and Italian and was included in the anthologies Oranges in the Sun (2006) and Perle dello Yemen (2009).

References

Yemeni writers
Yemeni journalists
Living people
Year of birth missing (living people)